Tasiujaq (Inuktitut syllabics: ᑕᓯᐅᔭᖅ) formerly Eclipse Sound is a natural waterway through the Arctic Archipelago within the Qikiqtaaluk Region, Nunavut, Canada. It separates Bylot Island (to the north) from Baffin Island (to the south). To the east, it opens into Baffin Bay via Pond Inlet, and to the north-west into the Navy Board Inlet.

References

External links 

Sounds of Qikiqtaaluk Region